Awoiska van der Molen (born 1972) is a Dutch photographer, living in Amsterdam. She has produced three books of black and white landscape photographs, made in remote places. Van der Molen has been shortlisted for the Deutsche Börse Photography Foundation Prize and the Prix Pictet, and her work is held in the collections of the Huis Marseille, Museum for Photography and the Victoria and Albert Museum.

Life and work
Van der Molen studied architecture and design at Academie Minerva in Groningen, Netherlands, then photography at Hunter College, City University of New York, New York City. In 2003 she gained an MFA in photography at Academy of Art and Design St. Joost in Breda, Netherlands.

Between 2000 and 2003, she  made portraits of charismatic women she met on the streets of Manhattan, later switching to people judged by different criteria. After that she turned to photographing anonymous buildings at the edge of the city. Since 2009 Van der Molen has concentrated on the natural world, travelling alone to remote places in order to make the work. She makes black and white prints in her own darkroom. Her first book, Sequester (2014), "photographed throughout the whole of Europe" including the volcanic Canary Islands, contains monochromatic "landscapes, at times abstractly rendered to the point of dissolving into abstractions [. . . ] often obliterating all sense of the physical scale that was in front of the camera, many of them using very narrow ranges of tonality, from the blackest black to maybe a dark grey". Blanco (2017) contains photographs of desolate landscapes and trees. The Living Mountain (2020) is "a book about land, solitude and the planet we inhabit." Sean O'Hagan and Jörg Colberg have praised the quality of her prints.

Publications

Books of work by van der Molen
Sequester. Amsterdam: FW, 2014. . Edition of 750 copies.
Second edition. Edition of 2000 copies.
Blanco. Amsterdam: FW, 2017. . With a text by Arjen Mulder. Edition of 1500 copies.
The Living Mountain. Amsterdam: FW, 2020. .

Publications with contributions by van der Molen
De laatste fotograaf?. Breda, Netherlands: AKV/St. Joost, 2009.
Quickscan #01. Rotterdam, Netherlands: Nederlands Fotomuseum, 2010. Edited by Frits Gierstberg.
Hyeres 26th International Festival Photography catalogue. 2011. Edited by Raphaelle Stopin.
Alt+1000 High Altitude. By Nathalie Herschdorfer. 2011.
Fotoverhalen collection catalogue. The Hague, Netherlands: Fotomusem Den Haag, 2014. .
The Marseillaise collection catalogue. Fotomuseum Huis Marseille, 2014.
Hariban Award 2014. Kyoto: Benrido Collotype Atelier, 2014. With text in Japanese and English. Edition of 150 copies.
Object Onder / Object Below Sanders Collection. Amsterdam: Pieter & Marieke Sanders, 2015. .
The Grain of the Present. San Francisco: Pier 24 Photography, 2017. With a text by Kim Beil. .
Deutsche Börse Photography Foundation Prize. 2017. .
Failed Images: Photography and its Counter-Practices. Leiden: E.J. van Alphen, 2019. .
Into the Woods: Trees in Photography. London: Thames & Hudson, 2019. .

Exhibitions

Solo exhibitions
Blanco, Foam Fotografiemuseum Amsterdam, 2016.

Group exhibitions
Into the Woods: Trees in Photography, Victoria and Albert Museum, London, 2018

Collections
Huis Marseille, Museum for Photography, Amsterdam: 4 prints (as of November 2020)
Victoria and Albert Museum, London: a set of 8 collotype prints (as of November 2020)

Awards
2014: Grand Prize, Hariban Award, Benrido Collotype Atelier, Kyoto, Japan
2017: Larry Sultan Photography Award, Pier 24 Photography and McEvoy Foundation for the Arts, San Francisco, Califnrnia
2017: Shortlisted, Deutsche Börse Photography Foundation Prize, London, for her exhibition Blanco at Foam Fotografiemuseum Amsterdam
2019: Shortlisted, Prix Pictet, Geneva

References

External links
 

Dutch women artists
21st-century Dutch photographers
Dutch women photographers
Hunter College alumni
Living people
1972 births